Andrea Pollack (later Pinske; 8 May 1961 – 13 March 2019) was a butterfly swimmer from East Germany who won three Olympic gold medals.

Pollack was born in 1961 in Schwerin. She was a member of SC Dynamo Berlin. She who won two gold medals at the 1976 Summer Olympics in Montreal, Quebec, Canada, at age fifteen. She won the individual 200 m butterfly and with the women's relay team in the 4×100 m medley. Pollack also collected two silver medals at the Montreal Games.

Pollack won a gold in the 4×100 m medley relay and a silver in the 100 m butterfly at the 1980 Moscow Olympics. In 1978 she twice broke the world record in the women's 200 m butterfly. In 1998, several former East German swimmers, including Pollack, went public with accusations against their coaches and physicians that they were systematically doped.

Pollack married Norbert Pinske who competed in cycling. Their son, Michael Pinske, went to the 2008 Summer Olympics as a judoka.

See also
 List of members of the International Swimming Hall of Fame

References

External links
 

1961 births
2019 deaths
Sportspeople from Schwerin
Olympic swimmers of East Germany
East German female butterfly swimmers
East German female freestyle swimmers
Swimmers at the 1976 Summer Olympics
Swimmers at the 1980 Summer Olympics
Olympic gold medalists for East Germany
Olympic silver medalists for East Germany
World record setters in swimming
World Aquatics Championships medalists in swimming
European Aquatics Championships medalists in swimming
Medalists at the 1980 Summer Olympics
Medalists at the 1976 Summer Olympics
Olympic gold medalists in swimming
Olympic silver medalists in swimming
Doping cases in swimming